Carol Anne Williams D.M.A., ARAM, FRCO, FTCL, ARCM (born 1972) is a British-born international concert organist and composer, now residing in America. She served from October 2001 and resigned her post in October 2016 as Civic Organist for the city of San Diego, California, performing regularly at the Spreckels Organ Pavilion. She was concurrently serving as the artistic director of the Spreckels Organ Society; producing the largest organ festival in North America since 2001. She was formerly the Artist in Residence at St. Paul's Cathedral San Diego.

Upon stepping down from her post as Civic Organist for the city of San Diego in October 2016, in recognition of her fifteen years of service, Carol was awarded the title of San Diego Civic Organist Emerita. Presently the Artist in Residence at Peachtree Christian Church in Atlanta, Georgia and the Artistic Director of Viscount North America.

As a featured musician on many media platforms, she highlights her profound love for the "King of Instruments." Carol hosts TourBus, a documentary series exploring the large and small, famous and unique pipe organs of the world, and also, hosts a YouTube talk show series called "On The Bench with Dr. Carol” where she interviews musical artists.

Early life and education
Williams was born in Great Britain in a Welsh family with musical influences. She began private lessons at age five and was able to read music before she was reading English. Her formal training started with five years at the Royal Academy of Music where she specialised in the organ, performing as a student of David Sanger. She obtained the academy's prestigious Recital Diploma, together with the LRAM for both organ and piano. She was awarded all the major prizes for organ performing and, during her studies, she became a Fellow of the Royal College of Organists and a Fellow of Trinity College London, as well as an Associate of the Royal College of Music.

Williams has also studied with Daniel Roth, the Organist at the Church of St. Sulpice, Paris. Moving to the United States, Williams undertook postgraduate study at Yale University under the direction of Thomas Murray. She was appointed University Chapel Organist and was awarded an Artist Diploma (AD) together with the Charles Ives Prize for outstanding achievement. She then relocated to New York City where she became the Associate Organist at the Cathedral of the Incarnation in Long Island's Garden City. She undertook doctoral study under McNeil Robinson at the Manhattan School of Music, where she received the Helen Cohn award for her Doctor of Musical Arts (D.M.A.) degree.

Career 
Williams has performed around the world, including: St. Sulpice and Notre Dame, Paris; Walt Disney Concert Hall, Los Angeles; Westminster Abbey; St Paul's Cathedral; King's College, Cambridge; The Queen's College, Oxford; Salisbury Cathedral; Blenheim Palace; Woolsey Hall, Yale University; Memorial Chapel, Harvard University; St. Patrick's Cathedral, New York; Washington National Cathedral; St. Ignatius Loyola, New York; Riverside Church, New York. She has also given numerous concerts in Sweden, Finland, Estonia, Monaco, Luxembourg, the Netherlands, Poland, Germany, Denmark, Singapore, China and Russia.

Williams has been elected an Associate of the Royal Academy of Music (ARAM) in recognition of her contribution to music.
A regular broadcaster in the UK and in America, she has been the guest performer with a number of leading orchestras including the BBC Concert Orchestra, San Diego Symphony Orchestra and the Beijing Symphony Orchestra. She performed the inaugural recitals on a newly installed Austin organ in Beijing's Forbidden City Concert Hall.

Williams has been interviewed on many radio programs, in which she has highlighted her 'profound love' of the organ, and she is featured in the national-awareness video Pulling out all the Stops when she was filmed in concert at St. Thomas' Church on New York's Fifth Avenue. She also took part in the Virgil Fox Memorial Concert held in the fall of 2000 at New York's Riverside Church, and a recording of the event was released.

Williams also hosts a video series TourBus, which focuses on various pipe organs around the world as with the music, people and places associated with them.

In October 2001, Williams became the first woman in the United States to be appointed Civic Organist. She served as the San Diego Civic Organist and Artistic director of the Spreckels Organ Society in San Diego, California from 2001 to 2016. Williams performs an average of 75 concerts a year worldwide.

Williams regularly attracts new audiences to the pipe organ with charismatic humor and programs of intense genre diversity, including collaborations with various jazz, blues, pop and rock bands. Concert patrons have received her live performances with 'rock star' enthusiasm.

Philanthropy 
Williams performs about 20 hours of free organ concerts a year to raise awareness and funds for various charitable organisations.

Compositions 
Published by Melcot Music:
TourBus (For Organ and Drums) ©2008
Twilight (For Organ) ©2013
Major Something, Non Fat Latte! (For Organ) ©2013
Bonnie Eriskay (For Organ and Bagpipes) ©2013
Suite For Organ ©2014
Daisy Violin (Violin and Organ) ©2014
Dragon Dance (Violin and Organ) ©2014
Venus Toccata (For Organ) ©2014
Three Thoughts (For Piano) ©2014
Freedom (For Organ) ©2014
Centennial Spreckels Fanfare (For Organ) ©2014
Tiger Lilly Waltz (For Organ)  ©2014
Divine Song (For Organ and Voice) ©2015
For Michael (For Piano) ©2015
Dietrich's Dilemma! (For Organ) ©2015
Andromeda (For Organ) ©2015
Sophie's Game (For Organ) ©2015

Discography 
Produced by Melcot Music:
Rejoice with Dr. Carol MCTCD023
Just Carol Compositions MCTCD022
Carol's Christmas MCTCD021
Carol Williams Plays – Volume 2, Madness! MCTCD020
Carol Williams Plays MCTCD019
Mainly French MCTCD018
Hey Wurlitzer MCTCD016
Maid in China MCTCD015
Wurlitzer Plus! MCTCD014
Orchestral! MCTCD013
Tour de Force MCTCD012
Classic Power: Popular Organ Music From Winchester Cathedral MCTCD011
Just Rags MCTCD007
Hammond Today MCTCD002
Carol Williams’ Collection
Sunday at 2
Blenheim Palace
Oxford Town Hall
Produced by Rumley Music:
House of Scotland RMCD1220

Videos 
Produced by Valentine Music:
Blenheim Palace – A Musical Tour OSV-507
Organ Showcase OSV-508
Produced by Bell Video:
TourBus 1 to the King of Instruments MCTDVD001
TourBus 2 goes to Methuen MCTDVD002
TourBus 3 goes to Spreckels MCTDVD003
TourBus 4 goes to Paris MCTDVD004
TourBus 5 goes to Luxembourg MCTDVD005
TourBus 6 goes to Ocean Grove MCTDVD006
TourBus 7 goes to Disney Hall MCTDVD007
TourBus 8 goes Celtic MCTDVD008
TourBus 9 First Congregational Church, Los Angeles MCTDVD009
TourBus 10 goes to St. Paul's Cathedral San Diego MCTDVD010
TourBus 11 goes to the Compenius Organ in Denmark MCTDVD011
TourBus 12 goes to the Salomons' Welte Organ in England  MCTDVD012
TourBus 13 goes to the Peragallo Pipe Organ Company USA MCTDVD013

References

External links

 Carol Williams' official website
 Carol Williams' FaceBook

American classical organists
Women organists
British classical organists
British expatriates in the United States
Living people
Alumni of the Royal Academy of Music
Associates of the Royal College of Music
Fellows of the Royal College of Organists
Musicians from San Diego
People from Valley Center, California
Articles containing video clips
1962 births
20th-century organists
20th-century American women musicians
21st-century organists
21st-century American women musicians
Classical musicians from California
21st-century American keyboardists